Fiction in the 1970s brought a return of old-fashioned storytelling, especially with Erich Segal's Love Story. The early seventies also saw the decline of previously well-respected writers, such as Saul Bellow and Peter De Vries, both of whom released poorly received novels at the start of the decade, but rebounded critically as the decade wore on. Racism remained a key literary subject.  John Updike emerged as a major literary figure with his 1971 novel Rabbit Redux. Reflections of the 1960s experience also found roots in the literature of the decade through the works of Joyce Carol Oates and Wright Morris. With the rising cost of hardcover books and the increasing readership of "genre fiction", the paperback became a popular medium. Criminal non-fiction also became a popular topic. Irreverence and satire, typified in Kurt Vonnegut's Breakfast of Champions, were common literary elements.  The horror genre also emerged, and by the late seventies Stephen King had become one of the most popular novelists in America, a coveted position he maintained in the following decade.

In nonfiction, several books related to Nixon and the Watergate scandal topped the best-selling lists. 1977 brought many high-profile biographical works of literary figures, such as those of Virginia Woolf, Agatha Christie, and J. R. R. Tolkien. Books discussing sex such as Everything You Always Wanted to Know About Sex* (*But Were Afraid to Ask) were popular as authors took advantage of the lifted censorship laws on literature in the sixties. Exposés such as All the President's Men were also popular. Self-help and diet books replaced the cookbooks and home fix-it manuals that topped the sixties's charts.

Fiction
After the experimentation and sexual offence subject matter that exemplified some of the sixties' most definitive works of literature, the early '70s brought a return to old-fashioned storytelling. Erich Segal's Love Story was a tender romance that captured America, topping best-seller lists for the better part of the year and producing a successful film adaptation by the end of 1970.

The seventies also saw the decline of previously well-respected writers, such as Saul Bellow and Peter De Vries, who both released poorly received novels at the start of the decade. Meanwhile, Islands in the Stream, a posthumously released Ernest Hemingway novel, was released. While Hemingway's classic style showed through, it was criticized as overwrought.

Racism remained a key subject in literature throughout the early seventies. While Madison Jones' A Cry of Absence and Ernest J. Gaines' The Autobiography of Miss Jane Pittman studied racism in the past, works like that of Nadine Gordimer and Bernard Malamud studied race relations in South Africa and New York respectively.

In the early seventies, John Updike emerged as a major literary figure with the release of Bech: A Book, a semi-autobiographical look at a Jewish novelist, the continuing Rabbit series (including 1971's popular Rabbit Redux), and his numerous subtle, relevant stories. Reflections of the 1960s experience also found roots in the literature of the decade through the works of Joyce Carol Oates and Wright Morris. Books like Looking for Mr. Goodbar by Judith Rossner explored sex, single-parenthood, and the singles life in fresh, intriguing, and even unsettling light.

With the rising cost of hardcover books and the increasing readership of "genre fiction", the paperback became a popular medium through the popular fiction of Peter Benchley and Thomas Pynchon. Criminal non-fiction also became a popular topic with works such as The Onion Field, written by Los Angeles policeman Joseph Wambaugh, and the narrative Helter Skelter, about the infamous Charles Manson killings, written by Vincent Bugliosi and Curt Gentry.

1975 brought the popular Watership Down by Richard Adams, a juvenile novel about a family of rabbits which found a home in mainstream literary circles. Joseph Heller's dramatic novel of middle age, Something Happened, was the author's first book since Catch-22 in 1961. James A. Michener also returned to prominence in the seventies, first with Chesapeake, a story of four families interwoven throughout their interactions in the Chesapeake Bay area of Maryland, and later with Centennial, a historical novel about a family living in Colorado in the time of the 1870s. In 1976, Centennial was adapted to a popular television miniseries. John Jakes would release a Bicentennial series of novels himself, which helped launch his writing career and were nearly as popular as Michener's book.

E. L. Doctorow's Ragtime became one of the most popular books of 1976 with its unconventional style and satiric nature. Saul Bellow returned with the Pulitzer Prize-winning Humboldt's Gift, about a failed poet and a rising playwright. The same year Alex Haley released his immensely popular Roots: The Saga of an American Family, which followed Haley's ancestry back to the kidnapping of a young black man named Kunta Kinte, who was sold into slavery in the south. Also that same year, Alice Walker published Meridian, about the Civil Rights Movement, and Renata Adler released the feminist classic, Speedboat.

By the late seventies, a former English teacher from Maine had become one of the most popular genre novelists with his tales of horror and suspense. Stephen King's 1974 novel, Carrie, became a best seller and spawned a popular 1976 film. He followed Carrie with 'Salem's Lot, a vampire tale; The Shining, a spooky romp set in a deserted hotel; The Stand, a post-apocalyptic shocker; and The Dead Zone, about a comatose man who awakens with psychic abilities. King also released a collection of short stories and two novels under the pseudonym Richard Bachman.

The world of fiction saw a return of the muckraker. Books by John Blair and Robert Engler warned of the problems caused by America's dependence on oil while Sidney Lens' The Day Before Doomsday warned of nuclear annihilation. Mario Puzo's much-awaited follow-up to The Godfather, Fools Die, was released in 1978 and instantly became a best seller.

Notable works such as William Styron's Holocaust epic, Sophie's Choice, rounded out the decade. Kurt Vonnegut's Jailbird reflected the comic results of the Watergate scandal while Nadine Gordimer continued to write in favor of an end to Apartheid. By decade's end, Tom Wolfe topped the best-seller lists with The Right Stuff, which celebrated the early NASA test pilots and astronauts.

After two decades of cookbooks, historical novels and inspirational religious fiction topping the bestseller charts, literature in the seventies took a new turn. The independence and freedom themes of the sixties showed up in early seventies literature, with a 1970 fiction top ten bestseller, The French Lieutenant's Woman by John Fowles. Fowles tells a story about a woman choosing to raise a child on her own in an artists world, as opposed to marrying into money and high society.

As the picture books and inspirational religious fiction of the sixties disappeared, irreverence and satire became the norm. In Breakfast of Champions, Kurt Vonnegut in 1973 maintained with humorous analogy an extensive satirical discussion of American society, revealing his views on such topics as marketing, government and the environment. Richard Adams in Watership Down commented on the environment and the land development industry, speaking through a society of rabbits. In 1972, Richard Bach made an avatar out of a bird in Jonathan Livingston Seagull, and by 1977 made a savior out of a car mechanic in Illusions: Adventures of a Reluctant Messiah. Vonnegut ended the decade with Jailbird, a satire on the innocent unknown faces, the guilty known ones, and the born again Christians that spent time in prison because of Richard Nixon and the Watergate scandal.

The resurgent popularity of the horror novel, which had begun in the late 1960s with Ira Levin's Rosemary's Baby continued with The Exorcist by William P. Blatty in 1971 and with the sensational Amityville Horror by Jay Anson in 1977. In 1979, Stephen King first made the fiction top ten with The Dead Zone, a fitting end to seventies literature, and along with Vonnegut, Bach, the diet books and the self-help manuals on the lists in 1979, gave a good indication of what American society would be reading in the future, and how much the seventies impacted and helped to change American culture.

Nonfiction
Carl Bernstein and Robert Woodward, writers from the Washington Post, published The Final Days in 1976. The best-selling book documented the downfall of President Richard Nixon, and their involvement in his resignation, he was not impeached. Throughout this period many other books related to Nixon and the Watergate scandal topped the best-selling lists.

1977 brought many high-profile biographical works of literary figures, such as those of Virginia Woolf, Agatha Christie, and J. R. R. Tolkien.

By 1975, the independence and freedom themes evolved into the swinging singles scene, with Looking for Mr. Goodbar by Judith Rossner at number four on the fiction top ten list. Sex hit the top of the non-fiction charts in 1970, with authors taking advantage of the lifted censorship laws on literature in the sixties. Everything You Always Wanted to Know About Sex* (*But Were Afraid to Ask) by David Reuben, M.D. took the number one spot, winning out over The New English Bible at number two, a book just as controversial. The New English Bible completely abandoned the conservative interpretation and traditional Bible phrasing for contemporary wording and modern analogy.

The exposé became a popular bestseller tool, hitting its high point with the 1974 number two non-fiction best seller, All the President's Men by Carl Bernstein and Bob Woodward, two journalists that exposed Richard Nixon and the Watergate scandal. At number one was The Total Woman by Marabel Morgan, which marked the beginning of the conservative right's counterattack on the sixties liberation and the seventies retreat from traditional values. The exposés throughout the seventies unveiled much of American society's secrets, including the treatment of Native Americans, the corporate world, and baseball, to name a few. A revealing exposé in 1979 finally reached the most esteemed rooms of the country, with The Brethren: Inside the Supreme Court by Bob Woodward and Scott Armstrong.

Self-help and diet books replaced the cookbooks and home fix-it manuals that topped the sixties's charts, and starting in 1972 there were at least two self-help books on every non-fiction top ten list through 1979, starting with I'm OK, You're OK, by Thomas Anthony Harris and ending with How to Prosper During the Coming Bad Years by Howard J. Ruff. Dr. Atkins' Diet Revolution started the bestseller health craze in 1972, with multiple diet and exercise books throughout the decade, ending with The Complete Book of Running by James Fixx in 1978, and The Complete Scarsdale Medical Diet in 1979.

Literature by year
 1970 in literature - Deliverance - James Dickey; Fifth Business - Robertson Davies
 1971 in literature - The End of Summer - Rosamunde Pilcher
 1972 in literature - Jonathan Livingston Seagull - Richard Bach
 1973 in literature - Burr - Gore Vidal; Gravity's Rainbow - Thomas Pynchon
 1974 in literature - Carrie - Stephen King
 1975 in literature - The Book of Sand - Jorge Luis Borges
 1976 in literature - Triton - Samuel R. Delany
 1977 in literature - The Sea, the Sea - Iris Murdoch; Song of Solomon - Toni Morrison
 1978 in literature - The World According to Garp - John Irving
 1979 in literature - Kane and Abel - Jeffrey Archer; A Bend in the River - V. S. Naipaul

References

Literature